The Vietnam National Museum of Fine Arts is located in Hanoi, Vietnam. It is a museum showcasing Vietnam's fine arts from a range of historical periods. It is the country's primary art museum, the second being the smaller Ho Chi Minh City Museum of Fine Arts.

The Museum exhibits Vietnam's fine arts from the Ancient time till the Modern time. Much of the 20th Century art presented in the museum is concerned with folk narratives of a nation in defence. As a collection it draws on themes of martyrdom, patriotism, military strategy and overcoming enemy incursion.

The museum presents a small collection of late 20th and early 21st Century painting, including works by artists exploring abstraction and abstract impressionism, giving greater attention to the individualist artist.

The site, 66 Nguyễn Thái Học Street, was selected by painter Nguyễn Đỗ Cung in 1963. The building, built in 1937, was an abandoned Catholic girl's boarding house. Next door at No. 65 was an artists' colony.

References

External links

Vietnam National Museum of Fine Arts at Frommer's
Vietnam National Museum of Fine Arts at Vietnam Online

French colonial architecture in Vietnam
Museums in Hanoi
Art museums and galleries in Vietnam